George Matthew Shelton (December 23, 1877 – January 18, 1949) was a soldier in the United States Army and a Medal of Honor recipient for his actions in the Philippine–American War.

Shelton joined the Army from Billington, Texas in May 1898, and retired with the rank of Major in September 1921.

Medal of Honor citation
Rank and organization: Private, Company I, 23d U.S. Infantry. Place and date: At La Paz, Leyte, Philippine Islands, April 26, 1900. Entered service at: Billington, Tex. Birth: Brownwood, Tex. Date of issue: March 10, 1902.

Citation:

Advanced alone under heavy fire of the enemy and rescued a wounded comrade.

See also
List of Medal of Honor recipients
List of Philippine–American War Medal of Honor recipients

References

External links

Texas State Cemetery

United States Army Medal of Honor recipients
United States Army soldiers
People from Brownwood, Texas
American military personnel of the Philippine–American War
1877 births
1949 deaths
Philippine–American War recipients of the Medal of Honor
Burials at San Francisco National Cemetery